William Robert King (16 December 1902 – January 1987) was an all-round sportsman who played cricket for both Ireland and the Straits Settlements, and played rugby union for Singapore.

Biography
Educated mainly in Tipperary, he excelled at sport, particularly cricket and rugby union. He entered Dublin University in 1921, where he quickly found himself part of the cricket team, for whom he played a first-class match against Essex in 1922. His sole appearance for the Irish national side came against Wales in August 1923, scoring 45 as Ireland beat Wales by an innings.

Soon after that match, he took up an appointment in Singapore, and eventually played both rugby for Singapore and cricket for the Straits Settlements, playing against the Federated Malay States in 1926. He joined the army in 1941, and was awarded the Military Medal for bravery in the Battle of Singapore. He was captured when the city fell and spent the remainder of the war in Changi Prison. He later returned to live in Ireland, and married late in life, having children in his late 70s.

See also
 List of Irish cricket and rugby union players

References

1902 births
1987 deaths
Irish soldiers in the British Army
Sportspeople from County Clare
Irish cricketers
Straits Settlements cricketers
Dublin University cricketers
Singaporean rugby union players
British Army personnel of World War II
British World War II prisoners of war
World War II prisoners of war held by Japan
Recipients of the Military Medal
Irish rugby union players
British Army soldiers